The Meitei script, also known as the Meetei script, is an abugida used for the Meitei language, the official language of Manipur state and one of the 22 official languages of India. It is one of the official scripts of the Indian Republic. It is also popularly known as the Kanglei script and the Kok Sam Lai script. Its earliest known evidence of existence dates back to the 6th century AD coins, engraving the Meitei letters, as verified by the various publications of the National Sahitya Akademi. It was used until the 18th century, when it was replaced by the Bengali alphabet. A few manuscripts survive. In the 20th century, the script has experienced a resurgence, and is again being used. Starting from 2021, Meitei script (officially known as Meetei Mayek) was officially used by the Government of Manipur, along with the Bengali-Assamese script, to write the Meitei language, as per "The Manipur Official Language (Amendment) Act, 2021".

Since Meitei does not have voiced consonants, there are only fifteen consonant letters used for native words, plus three letters for pure vowels. Nine additional consonant letters inherited from the Indic languages are available for borrowings. There are seven vowel diacritics and a final consonant diacritic. The names of the twenty-seven letters are not only phonetic names, but also based on parts of the human body.

History

6th century - 7th century 
The ancient Meitei script (old Manipuri script) is first evident in the coins issued during the eras of Meitei Kings, Ura Konthouba (568-653 AD) and Ayangba (821-910 AD). These coins are presently preserved in the Mutua Museum in Imphal.

The earliest stone inscription in Meitei script found from the Khoibu village in Manipur is widely believed to of the time of King Ura Konthouba, that is around 6th-7th century CE. But there is no authenticity of the fact as of now. This Meitei inscription is presently kept in the Manipur Government Museum, Imphal.

8th century 
The earliest copper plate Meitei inscription dates back to the 8th century AD. It was inscribed during the reign of Meitei King Khongtekcha (c. 721 AD). It was discovered by scholar Yumjao from Phayeng village in the east of Imphal in the year 1935. It is one of the preserved earliest known written records for Meitei literature.

Yumjao, the discoverer of the 8th century copper plate inscription, opined that Meitei script was developed during the 8th century, but his fact was contradicted by the evidence of the Meitei script engravings on the coins of the 6th-7th century eras. This contradiction is well noted in the Volume 1 of the Encyclopedia of Indian Literature published by the Sahitya Akademi in the year 1987.

11th century 
Contradictory to the various publications of the National Sahitya Akademi about the unanimous earliest attested dating of the Meitei script, many people gave personal opinions in their research works as Meitei script was developed in the 11th century, 18th century, 19th century, etc. 
The Meitei script is a Brahmic abugida. According to Singh (1962), an archaic form of the script had developed by the 11th century, and it was in use until the early 18th century, when it was replaced by the Bengali script. By contrast, Tomba (1993) claims that the script is a development of c. 1930, with all supposedly older documents being deliberate forgeries. According to K.S. Singh and Mahoharan (1993), as per the modifications of the phonemic distributions of Meitei language, the script belongs to the Tibetan group of scripts.

A stone inscription found at Khoibu in Tengnoupal district, of current Manipur state, contains royal edicts of king Senbi Kiyamba (d. 1508), representing the earliest portion of the Chietharol Kumbaba or Royal Chronicle of Manipur. It is one of the primary texts in the Meitei script.

20th century 
In 1980, a modernized version of the writing system was approved by Manipur state law for use in educational institutions.

21st century

2009 
The modernised version of the Meitei script was encoded in Unicode in the year 2009.

2023 planning in 2022 

Letters

One of the unique features of this script is the use of body parts in naming the letters. Every letter is named after a human body part in the Meitei language. For example, the first letter "kok" means "head"; the second letter "sam" means "hair"; the third letter "lai" means "forehead", and so on. This is corroborated from the holybook "Wakoklon Heelel Thilel Salai Amailon Pukok Puya", which details how each script originated received its nomenclature.

Primary letters

Evolved consonant letters

Lonsum letters

Vowel diacritics

Numerals

In Meitei religion 

In Sanamahism (traditional Meitei religion), the Meitei letters (including Meitei numerals) are believed to be the divine creations (or the divine manifestations) of the supreme deity in the universe.

Unicode 
The Meitei script was added to the Unicode Standard in October, 2009 with the release of version 5.2.

Blocks

The Unicode block for the Meitei script, called Meetei Mayek, is U+ABC0 – U+ABFF.

Characters for historical orthographies are part of the Meetei Mayek Extensions block at U+AAE0 – U+AAFF.

Software 

Meitei Mayek keyboards and other input methods are available at or supported by:
 Gboard
 Apple iOS 13
 Linux
 Macintosh operating systems
 Microsoft SwiftKey
 Windows

Sample text 
The following is a Meitei language sample text of the Article 1 of the Universal Declaration of Human Rights (by the United Nations) in Meitei script, its romanisation, its IPA and its English version:

See also 

 Meitei inscriptions
 List of Meitei-language newspapers
 Meetei Mayek (Unicode block)
 Meetei Mayek Extensions (Unicode block)
 Wikipedia:Meitei script display help

Notes

References

Bibliography
 Chelliah, Shobhana L. (1997). A grammar of Meithei. Berlin: Mouton de Gruyter. .
 Chelliah, Shobhana L. (2002). Early Meithei manuscripts. In C. I. Beckwith (Ed.), Medieval Tibeto-Burman languages: PIATS 2000: Tibetan studies: Proceedings of the ninth seminar of the International Association of Tibetan Studies, Leiden 2000 (pp. 59–71). Leiden, Netherlands: Brill.
 Chelliah, Shobhana L. (2002). A glossary of 39 basic words in archaic and modern Meithei. In C. I. Beckwith (Ed.), Medieval Tibeto-Burman languages: PIATS 2000: Tibetan studies: Proceedings of the ninth seminar of the International Association of Tibetan Studies, Leiden 2000 (pp. 189–190). Leiden, Netherlands: Brill.

External links 

Omniglot, a guide to written language

Officially used writing systems of India
Meitei language
Meitei script
Brahmic scripts